
Gmina Czeremcha is a rural gmina (administrative district) in Hajnówka County, Podlaskie Voivodeship, in north-eastern Poland, on the border with Belarus.

Villages
Gmina Czeremcha contains the villages and settlements of Berezyszcze, Bobrówka, Borki, Chlewiszcze, Czeremcha, Czeremcha-Wieś, Derhawka, Gajki, Jancewicze, Konik, Kuzawa, Opaka Duża, Opalowanka, Osyp, Piszczatka, Podorabie, Pohulanka, Połowce, Pożniki, Repiszcza, Sielakiewicz, Stawiszcze, Terechy, Turowszczyzna, Wólka Terechowska and Zubacze.

Neighbouring gminas
Gmina Czeremcha is bordered by the gminas of Kleszczele, Milejczyce and Nurzec-Stacja. It also borders Belarus.

References
Polish official population figures 2006

Czeremcha
Hajnówka County